Roselyn Christine Jones  (born 20 December 1949) is a Labour Party politician in the United Kingdom who is the Mayor of Doncaster, first elected in 2013.

Early life
Her father worked at Askern Main Colliery, seven miles north of Doncaster. She was born Roselyn Cavnor to Edward (Eddy) Cavnor and Mary (Betty) Hunt. She has an older sister, three younger sisters, and a younger brother. She attended the Percy Jackson Grammar School, 1961 entrant.

Career
Jones served as Civic mayor of Doncaster in 2009–10.

Jones was appointed Commander of the Order of the British Empire (CBE) in the 2017 New Year Honours for services to local government.

In the 2018 World Mayor prize, Jones came runner up.

Jones retained her Mayor of Doncaster position in the 2021 election.

Personal life
Jones lives in Norton, Doncaster. She is the widow of Alan Jones, who was a Labour councillor for Norton and Askern until his death in August 2016. They married in 1977 in Doncaster and have a daughter born in October 1985.

References

External links
 Doncaster Council

1949 births
Living people
Commanders of the Order of the British Empire
Labour Party (UK) mayors
Labour Party (UK) councillors
Mayors of Doncaster
People from Norton, Doncaster
Women mayors of places in England
Women councillors in England